The Keys were an English, London-based band active from 1979 until 1983. The band was formed by bassist Drew Barfield (later of the Big Heat and Los Pacaminos), guitarist Steve Tatler, Ben Grove, and Paul McCartney's former drummer Geoff Britton. Joe Jackson produced the band's only album, The Keys Album for A&M, from which came several singles: "One Good Reason", "I Don't Wanna Cry" and "Greasy Money".

The Keys Album
Track listing:
All tracks written by Drew Barfield and The Keys, unless otherwise noted.

Side One
 "Hello Hello" – 3:30
 "It Ain't So" – 2:28
 "One Good Reason" – 3:15
 "Listening In" – (Tatler, The Keys) – 3:06
 "I Don't Wanna Cry" – 2:52
 "Saturday To Sunday Night" – 4:00
Side Two
 "Spit It Out" – 2:38
 "If It's Not Too Much" – 2:49
 "Run Run Run" – (Grove, The Keys) – 2:47
 "Greasy Money" – 3:30
 "Back To Black" – 3:18
 "World Ain't Turning" – 3:27
Personnel
 Ben Grove – guitar, vocals
 Steve Tatler – guitar, vocals
 Drew Barfield – bass, vocals
 Geoff Britton – drums

References

Musical groups from London
Musical groups established in 1979
Musical groups disestablished in 1983
A&M Records artists